Heinrich Blume (born 25 January 1887 in Hameln; died 26 July 1964 in Hannover) was a German teacher and an anti-semitic member of the Nazi Party (NSDAP) which he joined in the 1920s.

References

20th-century German educators
Nazi Party politicians
1887 births
1964 deaths
Members of the Reichstag of the Weimar Republic
National Socialist Freedom Movement politicians